Elías Ezequiel Machuca (born 28 March 2003) is an Argentine professional footballer who plays as a centre-back for Racing Club.

Club career
Machuca was spotted by Lanús whilst appearing for Orientacion Juvenil; amid interest from Racing Club. After being with Lanús between the ages of eight and twelve, the then central midfielder would leave in 2017 to belatedly join Racing Club. After progressing through their youth ranks, Machuca soon started to train with their first-team squad; as he made his unofficial debut in a friendly match against Athletico Paranaense in January 2020. Towards the end of that year, in November and December, he was an unused substitute for Copa de la Liga Profesional matches with Atlético Tucumán, Unión Santa Fe and Arsenal de Sarandí.

Machuca made his senior debut under manager Sebastián Beccacece on 11 December 2020 in a Copa de la Liga Profesional fixture versus Vélez Sarsfield, as he played the full duration of 2–1 loss away from home.

International career
Machuca received call-ups from Argentina at both U15 and U16 level. A first training call with the former came at the end of 2017, while he appeared in a friendly for the latter against their England counterparts in April 2019. He also won a few minor exhibition tournaments, in Portugal and France, with the U16s.

Career statistics
.

Notes

References

External links

2003 births
Living people
Sportspeople from Lanús
Argentine footballers
Argentina youth international footballers
Association football defenders
Argentine Primera División players
Racing Club de Avellaneda footballers